James Ronald McBride (born October 12, 1948) is a former American football player. A running back, he played in the National Football League for the Green Bay Packers.

Career
McBride played running back at the collegiate level at the University of Missouri from 1967 to 1969, appearing in 10 games each season. His college head coach was Dan Devine, who was later his coach with the Packers. He played in the 1968 Gator Bowl and the 1970 Orange Bowl. In his three college seasons, McBride gained 882 yards rushing, 251 yards receiving and 63 kick return yards. In his first season, 1967, he wore #26, and wore #32 in 1968 and 1969. His 1969 Missouri team—which also included future Packer Jon Staggers—had a 9-2 record and was named to the Missouri Sports Hall of Fame. McBride was the starting fullback for the West squad in the 1970 Coaches All-America Game in Lubbock, Texas.

McBride appeared in one game for the 1973 Packers, with whom he wore #24.
List of Green Bay Packers players

References

1948 births
Living people
People from Callaway County, Missouri
Green Bay Packers players
American football running backs
University of Missouri alumni
Missouri Tigers football players